The 1977 Czechoslovak motorcycle Grand Prix was the twelfth round of the 1977 Grand Prix motorcycle racing season. It took place on 7 August 1977 at the Brno circuit.

500cc classification

350 cc classification

250 cc classification

Sidecar classification

References

Czech Republic motorcycle Grand Prix
Czechoslovak
Motorcycle Grand Prix
Czechoslovak motorcycle Grand Prix